Charles P. Davis (June 5, 1872 – May 28, 1943) was a United States Army soldier received the Medal of Honor for actions during the Philippine–American War on May 16, 1899, with 29 other members of Young's Scout. He was one of thirteen members of Young's Scouts who were awarded the Medal of Honor between May 13–16, 1899. 

Charles Davis is buried in North Dakota Veterans Cemetery, Mandan, North Dakota.

Medal of Honor citation
Rank and organization: Private, Company G, 1st North Dakota Volunteer Infantry. Place and date: Near San Isidro, Philippine Islands, May 16, 1899. Entered service at: Valley City, N. Dak. Birth: Long Prairie, Minn. Date of issue: April 28, 1906.

Citation:

With 21 other scouts charged across a burning bridge, under heavy fire, and completely routed 600 of the enemy who were entrenched in a strongly fortified position.

See also

List of Medal of Honor recipients
List of Philippine–American War Medal of Honor recipients

Notes

1872 births
1943 deaths
People from Long Prairie, Minnesota
American military personnel of the Philippine–American War
United States Army soldiers
United States Army Medal of Honor recipients
People from Mandan, North Dakota
Philippine–American War recipients of the Medal of Honor